Hamidullah was a citizen of Afghanistan, who was held in extrajudicial detention in the United States's Guantanamo Bay detention camps, in Cuba.
His Guantanamo Internee Security Number is 1119.
Joint Task Force Guantanamo counter-terrorism analysts estimate he was born in 1963, in Kabul, Afghanistan.

He was transferred to the United Arab Emirates on August 15, 2016.

A senior Taliban leader, also named Hamidullah, surrendered on 24 November 2001.

According to a widely republished Associated Press article:
 ...was accused of having ties to Hezb-e-Islami Gulbuddin
 ...claimed he had been imprisoned by the Taliban, and had escaped and had been living as a refugee in Pakistan.
...blamed his capture on false denunciations prompted by his support for the return of former King Zahir Shah

Inconsistent identification

He was identified inconsistently on official US Government documents.
 He was identified as Hamidullah Haji on the Summary of Evidence memo prepared for his Combatant Status Review Tribunal on 12 November 2004.
 He was identified as Haji Hamidullah on the Summary of Evidence memo prepared for his first annual Administrative Review Board on 5 August 2005.
 He was identified as Hamid Allah Mowlowi Saedara Saed Abd Al Razak on habeas corpus petition 05-CV-1691 from 2005.
 He was identified as FNU Hamidullah on documents published in response to one of his habeas petitions on 6 December 2006.

Combatant Status Review Tribunal 

Initially the Bush administration asserted that they could withhold all the protections of the Geneva Conventions to captives from the war on terror.  This policy was challenged before the Judicial branch. Critics argued that the USA could not evade its obligation to conduct competent tribunals to determine whether captives are, or are not, entitled to the protections of prisoner of war status.

Subsequently, the Department of Defense instituted the Combatant Status Review Tribunals.  The Tribunals, however, were not authorized to determine whether the captives were lawful combatants—rather they were merely empowered to make a recommendation as to whether the captive had previously been correctly determined to match the Bush administration's definition of an enemy combatant.

Summary of Evidence memo

A Summary of Evidence memo was prepared for Hamidullah Haji
Combatant Status Review Tribunal on 
12 November 2004.
The memo listed the following allegations:
{| class="wikitable" border="1"
|
a. The detainee is associated with al Qaeda:
The detainee has long established ties to HIG
HiG is a terrorist organization
The detainee was reported absent from a HiG leadership meeting conducted after his capture.
The detainee controlled a cache of weapons, including Kalashnikov rifles, machine guns, RPGs and rockets.
The detainee was captured in the home of an al Qaeda financier.

b. The detainee supported hostilities in aid of enemy armed forces:
The detainee reportedly led a group of 30 men who conspired to attack coalition forces in the vicinity of Kabul, Afghanistan.
|}

Transcript

Hamidullah chose to participate in his Combatant Status Review Tribunal.

Testimony 
Hamidullah acknowledged being a member of HIG, but fifteen years ago, during his youth; elder members of his family pushed him into it.  He had served under a commander named Abdul Khadar.  It was during the Soviet invasion of Afghanistan and everyone joined one or another of the groups resisting the Soviets.  When the Taliban came to power he cut all ties with HiG.

He said he thought the Taliban would bring unity to Afghanistan, and the tribal and regional wars would disappear, and had gone to enlist with them. However, they threw him in prison, because of his earlier association with HiG.

He denied that he controlled a weapons cache.  He stated that he was illiterate, and this  would have barred him from such an important task.

He said he was not arrested in the home of an al-Qaeda financier.  He said he was arrested in a house where he had been told to stay by Mullah Izat, a Northern Alliance commander, when he had returned to Afghanistan.  After he escaped from the Taliban he and his family had been staying in Pakistan, as refugees, during the Taliban's time in power.

He said that he had some responsibilities for a group of fighters - but fifteen years ago, during the Soviet occupation.  Further, he had not been that group's commander, but rather he was the one sent to the market to shop for foodstuff.

He said that when the Americans evicted the Taliban he wanted to work to help bring former king Zahir Shah back to power.  He said he made contact with General Rahim Wardak.  He said  Defense Minister Fahim Khan and Besmil Khan, the commander of the Northern Alliance sent him a message:

...don't do this; we are mujahedin, and the King is a Western guy, and we don't need him.  This won't be good for your future.

He had once attended a speech by Gulbuddin Hekmatyar, the founder of HiG. However, he had never met him.

When told that the Tribunal was going to go into closed session, to consider the classified evidence, he was asked if there was anything he said during any of his interrogations that he wanted to expand on, or correct.  He replied that the allegations about storing weapons and about the leadership meeting were new.  He had never been asked about them during his interrogations.

The Tribunal officers commented on his willingness to cooperate, and asked why he was wearing an orange uniform.

Witness 

His witness was Nasrat Khan.  Khan testified that he had known Hamidullah's father in the HiG and that he met Hamidullah when he joined, as a teenager.  He testified that he remembered Hamidullah's desertion.

Hamidullah's orange uniform 

Hamidullah's Tribunal officers asked him to explain why he was wearing an orange uniform—the uniform issued to Guantanamo captives regarded as "non-compliant".

Habeas petition 05-cv-1691

Several petitions of habeas corpus were filed on Hamidullah's behalf, including 05-cv-1601 and 05-CV-1691.
In September 2007, the Department of Defense published the unclassified dossiers arising from the Combatant Status Review Tribunals of 179 captives.
The Department of Defense published 37 pages from his Tribunal.

On December 2, 2006, one of Hamidullah's habeas corpus hearings stirred controversy when the Bush administration tried to prohibit attorneys from contacting him.

Tribunal panel 12 convened on December 13, 2004, and confirmed his "enemy combatant" status.

Detainee election form

His Personal Representative met with him for 43 minutes on December 11, 2004.
His Personal Representative's notes state:
{| class="wikitable" border="1"
|
 Detainee wants to appear to the tribunal.
 Detainee wants to make an oral statement.
 Detainee requested and TP approved 2 witnesses:
1 in-camp witness: Haji Nasrat Khan (camp 4; ISN 1009)
1 out-of-camp witness: Mullah Hazet (District of Pahgman, Kabul AF)
 The in-camp witness (1009) told me he did not wish to appear before the tribunal on account of his health, but would provide a statement for the tribunal (to be submitted as Exhibit D-b).
|}

Administrative Review Board hearings 

Detainees who were determined to have been properly classified as "enemy combatants" were scheduled to have their dossier reviewed at annual Administrative Review Board hearings.  The Administrative Review Boards weren't authorized to review whether a detainee qualified for POW status, and they weren't authorized to review whether a detainee should have been classified as an "enemy combatant".

They were authorized to consider whether a detainee should continue to be detained by the United States, because they continued to pose a threat—or whether they could safely be repatriated to the custody of their home country, or whether they could be set free.

First annual Administrative Review Board hearing

A Summary of Evidence memo was prepared for Haji Hamidullah's first annual Administrative Review Board  on 5 August 2005.

The
two
page memo listed ten
"primary factors favor[ing] continued detention" and one
"primary factors favor[ing] release or transfer".

The following primary factors favor continued detention 
{| class="wikitable" border="1"
|
a. Commitment
The detainee was a member of the Hizb-I Islami Gulbuddin (HIG) during the jihad.  He served with the HIG before the Taliban regime took over.
The Hizb-I Islami Gulbuddin (HIG) was founded by Gulbuddin Hikmatyar as a faction of the Hizb-I Islami party in 1977.  It was one of the major mujahedin groups in the war against the Soviets.  HIG has long-established ties with Usama Bin Laden.

b. Connections/Associations
The detainee was a member of the Mahaz-e Melli Tanzim.
The Mahaz-e Melli Tanzim attempted to recruit and organize supporters in Kabul, Afghanistan, following the fall of the Taliban.  King Zahir Shah intended to establish a post-Taliban government for the purpose of rebuilding the war torn nation.
In 2003, the detainee was a HIG commander who worked directly for Abu Bakr, the alleged highest-ranking HIG commander in Kabul.  The detainee controlled a large weapons cache in Kabul.
The detainee was reported to be one of the heads of the Psychological Operations Wing of the HIG.
The detainee was captured in August 2003, in Kabul, in one of the homes owned by Raouf.

c. Detainee Actions and Statements
In May 2003, the detainee was the commander of 30 men, with ties to the Taliban, who were planning an attack on an Afghan National Directorate of Security (NDS) unit in the vicinity of Kabul City, Afghanistan.

d. Other Relevant Data
As a known HIG member, the detainee was arrested by the Taliban and placed in jail.  He spent 23 months in jail before escaping to Pakistan.
In November 2001, while attempting to recruit and organize supporters for Shah and the Mahaz-e Melli, Afghanistan, the Northern Alliance arrested the detainee, however the detainee escaped.
|}

The following primary factors favor release or transfer 
{| class="wikitable" border="1"
|
 a. The detainee claimed he is friendly to the United States and turned to the Islamic faith as being a reason not to kill.
|}

Transcript
Hamidullah chose to participate in his Administrative Review Board hearing.

Hamidullah's statement 

Hamidullah spoke at length about the problems that had beset Afghanistan because of the armed struggle between different groups.  He decried how Afghanistan had become the world's training ground for terrorism and suicide bombers.  He decried those who used suicide bombers, and expressed suspicion over their true motives.

He described how he wanted to work for a strong, unified, popular tolerant, democratic government.  He welcomed the intercession of the United Nations and the United States.  
He said: "With this new conditions under the United States and United Nations, whoever were a true patriot...whoever was [a] supporter of humanity and human rights and he wanted to rebuild Afghanistan.  He [would] supported the new government..."

He said that after the United States intervention some of their nominal allies worked, under the table, to hurt the new regime and cause chaos.  He believed Burhanuddin Rabbani, Abdul Rasul Sayyaf and Mohammed Fahim, were among those who did not have the best interests of the new regime at heart.  He expressed his suspicions that the Russians were backing the chaos-sowers.

Second annual Administrative Review Board hearing

A Summary of Evidence memo was prepared for Haji Hamidullah's second annual Administrative Review Board  on 26 March 2006.

The following primary factors favor continued detention 
The two
page memo listed eight
"primary factors favor[ing] continued detention" and two
"primary factors favor[ing] release or transfer".

{| class="wikitable" border="1"
|
a. Commitment
The detainee was a member of the Hezb-I Islami Gulbuddin for 10 years.
In November 2001, the detainee attempted to recruit and organize supporters for the Shah and the Mahaz-e Melli in Kabul.  The Northern Alliance arrested the detainee because of these efforts; however, the detainee escaped.
The detainee was arrested by the Taliban and placed in jail due to his affiliation with the Hezb-I Islami Gulbuddin. He spent 23 months in jail before escaping to Pakistan.
The detainee secretly recruited and organized members of the Mahaz-e Melli group. Consequently, rumors were spread throughout Kabul accusing the detainee of being involved with the Taliban and al Qaeda.

b. Connections/Associations
The Hezb-I Islami Gulbuddin was founded by Gulbuddin Hikmatyar as a faction of the Heab-I Islami party in 1977.  It was one of the major Mujahedin groups in the war against the Soviets and has long-established ties with Usama bin Laden.
The detainee was captured in August 2003, in Kabul, in a home owned by an al Qaida financier.
The detainee was identified as an Iranian intelligence officer.  The reliability of the source is not determined.

c. Intent
A source named the detainee as the commander of 30 men, with ties to the Taliban, planning an attack on an Afghan National Directorate of Security unit near Kabul.
|}

The following primary factors favor release or transfer 
{|
|valign="top" |a. || The detainee states that the only reason he worked for the Hezb-I Islami Gulbuddin was that they would provide food and money for the member and their families.
|-
|valign="top" |b. || The detainee claimed he is friendly to the United States and turned to the Islamic faith as being a reason not to kill.
|}

Transcript

In September 2007 the Department of Defense published a sixteen-page summarized transcript from the unclassified session of his second Administrative Review Board hearing.

Enemy Combatant election form

Hamidullah's Assisting Military Officer reported on the notes from the Enemy Combatant election form completed on 4 April 2006.
They met for sixty minutes for a pre-hearing interview.
His Assisting Military Officer described him as "very cooperative and attentive" during the interview.

HIG identification

Hamidullah explained that for refugees in Pakistan to receive food aid they needed to have an ID card.  Militia groups, like the HIG, issued ID cards.  Possessing one of these cards did not imply membership in the militia.  He estimated that more than two million refugees had been issued HIG ID cards.

Habeas corpus 05-cv-1601

Civil Action No. 05-cv-1601 was re-initiated in late 2008.

Military Commissions Act

The Military Commissions Act of 2006 mandated that Guantanamo captives were no longer entitled to access the US civil justice system, so all outstanding habeas corpus petitions were stayed.

Boumediene v. Bush

On 12 June 2008 the United States Supreme Court ruled, in Boumediene v. Bush, that the Military Commissions Act could not remove the right for Guantanamo captives to access the US Federal Court system.  And all previous Guantanamo captives' habeas petitions were eligible to be re-instated.
The judges considering the captives' habeas petitions would be considering whether the evidence used to compile the allegations the men and boys were enemy combatants justified a classification of "enemy combatant".

Protective order

On 15 July 2008 Kristine A. Huskey filed a "NOTICE OF PETITIONERS' REQUEST FOR 30-DAYS NOTICE OF TRANSFER" on behalf of several dozen captives including Hamidullah.

References 

20th-century births
2020 deaths
Year of birth uncertain
Afghan extrajudicial prisoners of the United States
Afghan refugees
Detainees of the Guantanamo Bay detention camp
Prisoners of the Taliban
People from Kabul Province